WIUV is an online radio station in Castleton, Vermont. It is the student-run station of Castleton University.

History

WIUV was licensed as a 10-watt educational station in 1976. It increased power to 124 watts in 1981 and 227 watts in 1984.

On May 1, 2019, WIUV shut down its FM station and began broadcasting exclusively online. WIUV rebranded as "Castleton Internet Radio." The Vermont State Colleges system concurrently returned the WIUV license to the Federal Communications Commission, which cancelled it on May 22, 2019.

Programming

WIUV's on-air programming consisted of music blocks and original student-produced programs.

References

External links
 

FCC History Cards for WIUV

IUV
IUV
Radio stations established in 1976
1976 establishments in Vermont
Castleton University
Internet radio stations in the United States
Defunct radio stations in the United States
Radio stations disestablished in 2019